Claudia, is a Mexican telenovela that aired on  Canal 4, Telesistema Mexicano in 1960. Starring Angélica María and Ernesto Alonso. with episodes of 30 minutes duration. Starring Maria Elena Marqués and Miguel Córcega.

Cast 
 Maria Elena Marqués as Claudia
 Miguel Córcega
 María Teresa Rivas
 Manolita Saval
 Raúl Farell
 Roberto Cañedo
 Angelines Fernández
 Nicolás Rodríguez
 Graciela Doring
 Marcos Ortiz
 Emilio Brillas
 Marina Marín

Production 
Original Story: Mimí Bechelani
Adaptation: Mimí Bechelani
Produced by: Colgate Palmolive
Producer/ Director: Leopoldo Labra

References 

1960 telenovelas
Mexican telenovelas
Televisa telenovelas
Television shows set in Mexico City
1960 Mexican television series debuts
1960 Mexican television series endings
Spanish-language telenovelas